This is a list of people who have served as Custos Rotulorum of Westmorland.

 Ambrose Middleton bef. 1544 – aft. 1547
 Alan Bellingham bef. 1558–1578
 Sir Thomas Boynton bef. 1579–1582
 Robert Bragge 1582–1584
 Sir Thomas Strickland 1584–1612
 Henry Clifford, 1st Baron Clifford 1621–1641
 Sir Philip Musgrave, 2nd Baronet 1641–1646
 Interregnum
 Sir Philip Musgrave, 2nd Baronet 1660–1678
 John Lowther, 1st Viscount Lonsdale 1678–1700
 Thomas Wharton, 5th Baron Wharton 1700–1702
 Thomas Tufton, 6th Earl of Thanet 1702–1706
 Thomas Wharton, 1st Earl of Wharton 1706–1714
 Thomas Tufton, 6th Earl of Thanet 1714
 Thomas Wharton, 1st Marquess of Wharton 1714–1715
 Henry Lowther, 3rd Viscount Lonsdale 1715–1751
For later custodes rotulorum, see Lord Lieutenant of Westmorland.

References

Institute of Historical Research - Custodes Rotulorum 1544-1646
Institute of Historical Research - Custodes Rotulorum 1660-1828

Westmorland